Norwich City Hall is an Art Deco building completed in 1938 which houses the city hall for the city of Norwich, East Anglia, in Eastern England.  It is one of the Norwich 12, a collection of twelve heritage buildings in Norwich deemed of particular historical and cultural importance. It was designated as a Grade II* listed building in 1971.

History
The new City Hall saw the demolition in Norwich of Tudor, Regency and Victorian buildings on St Peters Street and the Market Place, including many yards and dilapidated municipal buildings. The architects Charles Holloway James and Stephen Rowland Pierce, designed the building after Robert Atkinson had prepared a layout for the whole Civic Centre site at the request of Norwich Corporation (now the City Council). A competition took place in 1931 which attracted 143 entries, with Atkinson as the sole judge. After the winning design was chosen the Depression and a protracted planning process delayed the start of the building, and the foundation stone was not laid until 1936. Norwich City Hall was officially opened by King George VI and Queen Elizabeth on 29 October 1938.

Architecture

The architects designed for Norwich an Art Deco public building of national significance. It was built to the highest standards, using superior materials and methods of its day. Even the bricks were specially made, each one being two inches longer than usual to better reflect the proportions of the finished building. Charles Holloway James and Stephen Rowland Pierce engaged Alfred Hardiman as their consultant sculptor. He contributed the iconic lions passant which guard the building, and three figures of Recreation, Wisdom and Education outside the Council Chamber. His colleague James Woodford designed the six main bronze doors, incorporating 18 roundels showing the history and industry of Norwich. Eric Aumonier carved the city arms above the Regalia Room window on Bethel Street, and Margaret Calkin James provided textiles for some of the important rooms.

The materials used include Italian marble and English stone, Honduras mahogany and Australian walnut. Seating is upholstered in Moroccan leather, and rooms panelled in elm, oak, teak and birch. The Lord Mayor’s octagonal parlour is panelled in sycamore with French walnut trim, with the door finished in English walnut. The main frontage of the building is 280 feet long, incorporating a 200ft balcony. The city council claims that the balcony is the longest such structure in the UK. Meanwhile, the bell in the clock tower has the deepest tone in East Anglia.

See also

Norwich Market

References

External links 
 Norwich City Council
 Norwich City Hall on YouTube

Art Deco architecture in England 
Buildings and structures in Norwich
City and town halls in Norfolk
Grade II* listed buildings in Norfolk
Government buildings completed in 1938